The Medal of Merit is the oldest extant award medal presented by the Kingdom of Denmark.  Established by Christian VII on 16 May 1792, and re-instituted by ordinance of Christian VIII on 24 July 1845, it is a personal award of the Sovereign.

Appearance

The medal, depending on the version, is made of either gold or silver.  The obverse bears the effigy, in profile, of The Queen and the inscription, Margareta II – Regina Daniæ.  The reverse bears the single word Fortient, surrounded by an oak leaf wreath.  Recipient’s name is engraved on the edge of the medal.  This indicates that it is the personal property of the recipient, and is not returned upon death, like the badges of some orders of chivalry. The medal is suspended by a red ribbon with a white cross.

Recipients
Jutta Bojsen-Møller, educator and women's rights activist
Achton Friis, painter
Ingrid Jespersen, educator
Marie Kruse, educator
Søren L Kristensen, pilot
Samuel Margoshes, journalist, newspaper editor, activist
Maurice Egan
Camilla Nielsen (1928), philanthropist
Thora Fiedler, nurse, prosthetist and inventor

See also
 List of orders, decorations, and medals of the Kingdom of Denmark

References

External links
 Fortjenstmedaljen The Medal of Merit

Orders, decorations, and medals of Denmark